Protosticta antelopoides, spiny reedtail, is a damselfly species in the family Platystictidae. It is endemic to Western Ghats in India.

Description and habitat
It is a large slender damselfly with bottle-green eyes. Its thorax is bluish-black on dorsum  and sides are pale blue with a black stripe on the hinder border of the mesepimeron. Abdomen is black with pale yellow on the lower parts of sides. Segments 3 to 6 to have narrow yellow basal rings. Remaining segments are unmarked. It is bigger than any other known species of this genus. Female is similar to the male.

It is known to occur in Munnar, Idukki district and Kozhikode district of the Kerala. It is restricted to hill streams with good riparian forest cover.

See also 
 List of odonates of India
 List of odonata of Kerala

References

External links

Platystictidae
Insects of India
Insects described in 1931
Taxa named by Frederic Charles Fraser